The 80 Class is a type of diesel electric multiple unit formerly used by Northern Ireland Railways. They were affectionately nicknamed 'Thumpers' by rail enthusiasts due to the thumping noise their engines produced.

History
By the early 1970s, the MEDs and units inherited from the Great Northern Railway (GNR) had been in service for 20 years, and the MPDs for 10 years. To replace these increasingly life-expired units, Northern Ireland Railways (NIR) placed an order with British Rail Engineering Limited (BREL) for 9 new DMUs. These were to be built as four 3-car and five 2-car sets and were delivered in 1974/75. Structurally, the new trains were based on the British Rail Mark 2b bodyshell, which NIR was already using for the Enterprise service. The new trains were classified as the 80 Class.

The power cars were fitted with an English Electric 560 hp diesel engine, with electric transmission to two traction motors mounted on the rear bogie. The seating capacity of the power cars was 45, however after providing for wheelchair accommodation, this was reduced to 42. The vehicle also incorporated a guards/parcel compartment. The intermediate coaches were fitted with an additional door on each side to aid passenger flow and had a capacity of 87. The driving trailers had a small cab built at one end, which necessitated the removal of six seats. This cab was set to the left to preserve the gangway connection, so that two train sets could be coupled together and still allow passengers to travel between the trains. All three types are of integral construction, however the power cars, because of their weight, also have an underframe. They were similar to the UTA 70 Class, both mechanically and electrically.

The 80 Class was intended to replace the aging MED, MPD and ex-GNR AEC and BUT railcars on the NCC services and the suburban service between Bangor and Portadown. The railcars proved so successful that a second series was ordered in 1975, entering service in 1977/78.

Each vehicle was numbered individually, with power car numbers running from 67 to 69, and 81 to 99. The Intermediate Trailers were numbered 761 to 780 and the Driving Trailers were numbered 731 to 756. Power cars 81 to 89 were built between 1974/1975, while 67 to 69 and 90 to 99 were built between 1978/1979. Intermediate Trailers 761 to 764 were also built between 1974/1975, with 765 to 773 being completed between 1978/1979.  Likewise, the Driving Trailers were also completed in batches, with 731 to 739 built between 1974/1975 and 740 to 751 built between 1978/1979.  The additional coaches were conversions from BR or old NI Railways loco-hauled coaches, and were not original 80 Class vehicles. These were Driving Trailers 752 to 756 and Intermediate Trailers 774 to 780. During the mid-1990s the surviving vehicles were all renumbered by Translink, by adding 8000 to their numbers to avoid duplication with the bus fleet operated by Ulsterbus and Citybus, also Translink subsidiaries.

Use by Iarnród Éireann

Three 3-car sets were leased by Iarnród Éireann (IÉ) from NIR in October 1987 for use on, respectively, the Bray–Greystones shuttle (previously operated by a push–pull set rebuilt from CIÉ 2600 Class railcars), the Dublin Connolly–Maynooth route, and the Cork–Cobh line. They were originally intended as a short-term measure until Mark 3 push–pull sets became available. The sets entered service on 2 November. In addition to their regular services, they were employed on a variety of other workings, including a nine-car All-Ireland hurling special from Cork to Dublin. However, although the sets were fitted with Continuous Automatic Warning System and IÉ train radio in March 1990 and "for a while it appeared as if the units were going to be purchased by [IÉ]," NIR required them back when the lease expired at the end of October 1990. A brief "stay of execution" for the Greystones shuttle lasted until 26 November.

Refurbishment

Despite the increasing age and obsolescence of the 80 Class, the lack of available rolling stock meant that NIR was forced to retain a number of units, even in spite of the entry into service of the new Class 3000. Until 2011, NIR maintained up to three 4-car units for use on passenger services. These saw a pair of 2-car units, a power car and driving trailer, coupled back to back. Six trailers were refurbished and fitted with central door locking enabling them to remain in service until the new Class 4000 units entered service in 2012. (742 had been nominated for retention but was scrapped in May 2008 and replaced in the programme by 752)

The power cars were overhauled at LH services in Staffordshire and the trailers at York Road works in Belfast. Set 89-733-738-69  remained in service until 24 May 2008. Set 93-754-749-94 was sporadically on test from Wednesday 23 July 2008. From Monday 3 November 2008, regular passenger services commenced with this set.

On Thursday 17 December 2009, a second refurbished 80 class was deployed onto the Larne Line. The final sets on the Larne Line were 90-749-752-93 and 94-754-747-82. The third refurbished set was stored at York Road and it consisted of 69-733-738-89. It was rumoured that 82 had been withdrawn from service following from an engine fire. 82 was fixed and returned to working order after the fire in Larne.

On Tuesday 26 January 2010, 89 entered passenger service with 93, 90 was taken off the set on 23 January 2010. 90 was stored at the south end of the south siding at York Road.

Withdrawal from passenger service 
In 2011, the entire 450 Class fleet, together with the remaining 80 Class units, was listed by NI Railways for disposal.

The final 80 Class units were withdrawn from passenger service on Sunday 25 September 2011.

Sandite and final withdrawal 
97 was converted to a sandite spraying vehicle in 2006 and in 2006 and 2007 was used on these duties coupled to 89. On Wednesday 1 October 2008, 97 had a test run with refurbished 82 and this pair were used for sandite trains until December 2008.

In 2009, 97 was on Sandite duties again with 82. During October 2009 while out on sandite duties, the engine in 97 exploded. 82 struggled with hauling dead 97 so it was decided to add 94 to back of the train to help it along.

Three Power cars 69+94+90 and two driving trailers 749+752 were overhauled, and in 2012, 97 was painted in all-over yellow to help commuters identify it as a non-passenger train. In 2013, 69, 94 and 752 were repainted into all yellow livery to join 97. As part of this repaint, 69 was accidentally renumbered 96.

After the 2014 Sandite season, 94 was taken off the set and replaced with 90, which was never repainted into the Sandite train's yellow sandite livery. It ran as such for 2015, 2016 and 2017 with the final run taking place on Wednesday 22 November 2017.

All but one of the Sandite vehicles were preserved. The last remaining 80 Class vehicle in NIR ownership, 97, was scrapped at York Road on 8 June 2019.

Preservation

Downpatrick & County Down Railway 

On Tuesday 27 March 2018, the Downpatrick and County Down Railway announced it was to preserve four 80 Class vehicles, consisting of two power cars 69 and 90, and two driving trailers 749 and 752. 69 and 749 have been painted in the original, as-delivered maroon and blue livery. (See photo to right) The fundraising appeal for the campaign can be found on the DCDR's website. In April it emerged that the campaign was endorsed by Pete Waterman, one of the most notable individuals in the world of railway preservation and owner of several locomotives, including at one point No. 4472 ''Flying Scotsman''. 69 is particularly notable for having worked the last Peace Train in 1995, an accolade which made it the subject of an episode of Chris Tarrant: Extreme Railways in 2019.

90 and 752 left York Road for the Downpatrick and County Down Railway on 12 May 2018, and 69 and 749 joined them the next day. It is planned that No. 69 will be named ''Mike Collins'' in honour of the railway's former chairman. No. 69 was started for the first time in preservation on 26 May 2018. It ran for the first time under its own power on 23 June 2018, with a series of crew training and platform-gauging runs to Inch Abbey, Downpatrick Loop Platform, and Magnus Grave. Power car No. 90 was similarly started for the first time since it arrived at DCDR, on 7 July 2018. The same day, 69 and 749 entered the main platform at Downpatrick station, completing their gauging trials and thus enabling them to traverse the entire DCDR network.

69 and 749 put in a cameo appearance at the 2019 Irish Traction Group 30th anniversary diesel gala, but could not carry passengers due to ongoing floor repairs in 749. The pair were originally planned to enter service in May 2020, but their launch has been postponed until further notice due to the COVID-19 pandemic. 90 and 752 are much longer-term projects for full restoration, though 90 has successfully worked in multiple with 69 and 749 since arriving at DCDR.

Other 
Two other 80 Class vehicles are preserved outside the DCDR. Intermediate trailer 771 was purchased in May 2007 by a now-closed B&B in Ballynure, where it remains today. Power car 99 is at the East Lancashire Railway in England, having been purchased for spare parts for 207202. It is currently used as a workshop/storeroom.

Fleet details

Status Of 80 Class Units

Power cars

Intermediate Trailers

Driving Trailers

References 

0080
Diesel electric multiple units
BREL products